The 1982 Princeton Tigers football team was an American football team that represented Princeton University during the 1982 NCAA Division I-AA football season. Princeton tied for fourth place in the Ivy League.

In their fifth year under head coach Frank Navarro, the Tigers compiled a 3–7 record and were outscored 317 to 229. Victor L. Ruterbusch and Jonathan E. Schultheis were the team captains.

Princeton's 3–4 conference record earned it part of a four-way tie for fourth place in the Ivy League standings. The Tigers were outscored 215 to 154 by Ivy opponents.

This was Princeton's first year in Division I-AA, after having competed in the top-level Division I-A and its predecessors since helping to found the sport in 1872.

Princeton played its home games at Palmer Stadium on the university campus in Princeton, New Jersey.

Schedule

References

Princeton
Princeton Tigers football seasons
Princeton Tigers football